The women's 400 metres event at the 1988 World Junior Championships in Athletics was held in Sudbury, Ontario, Canada, at Laurentian University Stadium on 27, 28 and 29 July.

Medalists

Results

Final
29 July

Semifinals
28 July

Semifinal 1

Semifinal 2

Semifinal 3

Heats
27 July

Heat 1

Heat 2

Heat 3

Heat 4

Heat 5

Heat 6

Participation
According to an unofficial count, 38 athletes from 26 countries participated in the event.

References

400 metres
400 metres at the World Athletics U20 Championships